Kishon Khan (born 1 August 1970) is a Bangladeshi-born British jazz pianist, composer, arranger and music producer.

Early life
Khan grew up in North London and learned to play the piano as a child. He studied Economics at the University of East Anglia. During his 20s, he lived in Cuba for a while, which led to him being interested in Afro-Cuban music.

Career
In 1999, Khan set up the Afro-Cuban funk jazz band Motimba. The lineup of Motimba included Justin Thurgur (trombone), Graeme Flowers (trumpet), Oreste Noda (percussion), Jimmy Martinez (bass), Javier Camillo (vocals), Phil Dawson (guitar), and Tansay Ibrahim (drums). In 2003, Motimba's first album Monkey Vibrations was released.

Khan set up Lokkhi Terra, a musical project combining Bangladeshi music traditions with those from Africa and Latin America. A few members of the Motimba crew also play for Lokkhi Terra; in addition, the band features the Bengali vocalists Sohini Alam, Aanon Siddiqua and Aneire Khan. Lokkhi Terra have released two albums to date.

See also
British Bangladeshi
List of British Bangladeshis
List of jazz musicians

References

External links

1970 births
Living people
British Muslims
Bangladeshi emigrants to England
British people of Bangladeshi descent
British jazz musicians
British jazz pianists
Afro-Cuban jazz pianists
Jazz-funk pianists
Jazz arrangers
Jazz record producers
Musicians from London
Alumni of the University of East Anglia
21st-century pianists